Selma Reis (24 August 1960 – 19 December 2015) was a Brazilian actress and singer.

Born in São Gonçalo, Rio de Janeiro, she acted in various telenovelas and miniseries for Rede Globo, including Caminho das Índias, Páginas da Vida, Presença de Anita and Chiquinha Gonzaga. After time spent studying music in Nantes, France, in 1987, she released an eponymous debut album, the first of eleven releases.

She was married to photographer Locca Faria, with whom she had a son. The couple separated but remained friends for the last three years of her life.

In July 2014, Reis was diagnosed with brain cancer, and was treated at a hospital in Teresópolis. She was cremated in a Lutheran service in Nova Friburgo.

References

1960 births
2015 deaths
People from São Gonçalo, Rio de Janeiro
20th-century Brazilian women singers
20th-century Brazilian singers
Brazilian television actresses
Deaths from brain tumor
Deaths from cancer in Rio de Janeiro (state)
Neurological disease deaths in Rio de Janeiro (state)
Brazilian Lutherans
20th-century Lutherans
21st-century Brazilian women singers
21st-century Brazilian singers